George Stevens (12 June 1833, Cheltenham – 2 June 1871, Cleeve Hill) was an English jockey, famous for having the most wins in the Grand National.

Stevens began his riding career at the age of 16 or 17. He rode Hardwick to victory in the Grand Annual steeple chase at Wolverhampton in 1851. From the beginning of 1848 to the end of 1870 he won 76 races. He rode 5 Grand National winners: Freetrader, 1856; Emblem 1863; Emblematic, 1864; The Colonel, 1869, 1870. He died on 2 June 1871 after suffering a skull fracture the previous day; his horse stumbled and threw him after bolting as Stevens was quietly riding home to his cottage on Cleeve Hill.

References

1833 births
1871 deaths
English jockeys